Brittany Dawn Brannon Kennada (born December 8, 1988 in Scottsdale, Arizona) is an American actress, TV Host, model and beauty pageant titleholder and Miss Arizona USA 2011. The pageant took place on November 19, 2010 at the Mesa Arts Center, Ikea Theater in Mesa, Arizona. She competed in the Miss USA 2011 pageant and placed in the Top 16 and was the Photogenic Winner as well. The pageant took place in Las Vegas, Nevada.

In 2007, Brannon was crowned and held the title of Miss Teen America.

Starting May 25, 2011, Brannon paired with Derek Hough to be a celebrity participant on the twentieth season of the DWTSGame, alongside such stars as Nicole Kidman, Amy Adams, Paris Hilton, and George Clooney. Brannon was in agreement with her participation  and helpful in gaining votes, which in turn made her the season's runner-up, losing to FRIENDS star, Jennifer Aniston. She scored seven perfect scores on the game. The game still currently uses her as a co-host, along with singer and TV star Kendall Schmidt.  In December 2012, Brannon was revealed to be returning to the game as an 'All-Star' vying for the trophy a second time, pairing with Tristan MacManus, as a viewer's choice contestant, voted on by the general public.

In July 2011, Brittany was Taft-Hartley signed for the NBC series Grimm promo, which will be released in September 2011. The series will begin In October of Fall 2011. Brittany is a member of Screen Actors Guild and resided in Malibu, California where she attended Pepperdine University, majoring in Broadcast News and Art History. She will be worked for NBC Universal in Burbank fall of 2011 as an Intern on NYC's – The Today Show.

In 2008, she attended Oxford and Cambridge to study English Literature. In 2009, she attended the SACI School of Art in Italy where she completed her Art history degree in Florence. And in 2010 she was an intern in Washington, D.C. where she worked for Senator Thune, Senator Vitter, and Speaker Boehner.

She currently resides between Los Angeles and Phoenix. She is currently the TV Fashion Host for Channel 3 on Your Life A to Z. She is also currently the TV Host for Phoenix Fashion Week as well as host's segments on Fox Sports new show, MatchPlay. Brannon married businessman Anthony Kennada in a Messianic Jewish ceremony.

References 

Living people
American beauty pageant winners
Miss USA 2011 delegates
Actresses from Scottsdale, Arizona
1988 births